The 1990–91 season was the 82nd year of football played by Dundee United, and covers the period from 1 July 1990 to 30 June 1991. United finished in fourth place and missed out on European football for the first time in fifteen years.

Match results
Dundee United played a total of 50 competitive matches during the 1990–91 season. The team finished fourth in the Scottish Premier Division.

In the cup competitions, United lost in the final of the Tennent's Scottish Cup to Motherwell and lost in the Skol Cup semi-finals to eventual runners-up Celtic.

Legend

All results are written with Dundee United's score first.

Premier Division

United were leading Dunfermline 2–1 on 6 October when the match was abandoned due to heavy rain. The match was replayed four days later.

Tennent's Scottish Cup

Skol Cup

UEFA Cup

Player details
During the 1990–91 season, United used 25 different players comprising five nationalities. Maurice Malpas was the only player to play in every match. The table below shows the number of appearances and goals scored by each player.

|}

Goalscorers
United had 17 players score with the team scoring 67 goals in total. The top goalscorer was Darren Jackson, who finished the season with 18 goals.

Discipline
During the 1990–91 season, two United players were sent off. Statistics for cautions are unavailable.

Team statistics

League table

Transfers

In
The club signed five players during the season with a total public cost of nearly £400,000. In addition, one player played whilst on trial but left shortly afterwards.

Out
Two players were sold by the club during the season.

Playing kit

The jerseys were sponsored by Belhaven for the fourth season.

See also
1990–91 in Scottish football

References

External links
Glenrothes Arabs 1990–91 season review

1990-91
Scottish football clubs 1990–91 season